ALTIBASE is a hybrid database, relational open source database management system manufactured by The Altibase Corporation.  The software comes with a hybrid architecture which allows it to access both memory-resident and disk-resident tables using single interface. It supports both synchronous and asynchronous replication and offers real-time ACID compliance. Support is also offered for a variety of SQL standards and programming languages. Other important capabilities include data import and export, data encryption for security, multiple data access command sets, materialized view and temporary tables, and others.

History
From 1991 through 1997 the Mr. RT project was an in-memory database research project, conducted by the Electronics and Telecommunications Research Institute a government-funded research organization in South Korea. Altibase was incorporated in 1999.

Release 
The first version, called Spiner, was released in 2000 for commercial use. It took half of the in-memory DBMS market share in South Korea.

In 2002 the second version was released renamed to Altibase v2.0.
By 2003, Altibase v3.0 was released and it entered the Chinese market. 
Released version 4.0 with hybrid architecture, combining RAM and disk databases, was released in 2004.

In 2005 Altibase began working with Chinese telecommunications providers for billing systems,
and some financial companies in Taiwan, China, for home trading systems.
The software was certified by the Telecommunications Technology Association.
The Ministry of Government Administration and Home Affairs gave it an award in 2006.
Offices in China and United States opened in 2009.

In 2011, version 5.5.1 was renamed it to HDB (for "hybrid database"). The Altibase Data Stream product for complex event processing was renamed DSM.
The product received a Korean technology award.
Altibase introduced certification services.
In 2012, HDB Zeta and Extreme were announced, and  DSM renamed to CEP

In 2013, yet another variant called XDB was announced,
and the company received ISO/IEC 20000 certification.
In 2018, Altibase went open source.

Altibase went open source in February, 2018.

Clients
According to marketing research, Altibase had  650 customers and thousands of installations.

Altibase's clients in the telecommunications, financial services, manufacturing, and utilities sectors include Bloomberg, LG U+, E*TRADE, HP, UAT Inc., SK Telecom, KT Corporation (formerly Korea Telecom), Hyundai Securities, Samsung Electronics, Shinhan Bank, Woori Bank, The South Korean Ministry of Defense, G-Market, and Chung-Ang University.

Altibase users in Japan include FX Prime, a foreign exchange services company, and Retela Crea Securities.

In China, the three major telecommunications companies, China Mobile, China Unicom, and China Telecom, utilize ALTIBASE HDB in 29 of 31 Chinese provinces.

Altibase HDB

Features
ALTIBASE is a so-called "hybrid DBMS", meaning that it simultaneously supports access to both memory-resident and disk-resident tables via a single interface. It is compatible with Solaris, HP-UX, AIX, Linux, and Windows.
It supports the complete SQL standard, features Multiversion concurrency control (MVCC), implements Fuzzy and Ping-Pong Checkpointing for periodically backing up memory-resident data, and ships with Replication and Database Link functionality.

History
Altibase acquired an in-memory database engine from the Electronics and Telecommunications Research Institute in February 2000, and commercialized the database in October of the same year.
In 2001, Altibase changed the name of the in-memory database product from "Spiner" to "Altibase" in 2001. In 2004, Altibase integrated the in-memory database with a disk-resident database to create a hybrid DBMS, released version 4.0 and renamed it as ALTIBASE HDB. Altibase released version 5.5.1 and 6.1.1 in 2012, version 6.3.1 in November 2013, and 6.5.1 in May 2015. Altibase claims that this is the world's first hybrid DBMS.

References

Relational database management systems
NewSQL
Distributed computing architecture
Software using the GNU AGPL license
Free database management systems
Databases